John Wheeler may refer to:

Business
 John Wheeler (merchant) (died 1617), English businessman
 John Neville Wheeler (1886–1973), American publishing executive and magazine editor
 John Hervey Wheeler (1908–1978), African American bank president and civil rights leader
 John Wheeler (ironmaster) (died 1708), from Wollaston, Stourbridge, England, partner of Wilden Ironworks

Politics
 John Wheeler (Australian politician) (1853–1915), New South Wales politician
 John Wheeler (British politician) (born 1940), British politician and Northern Ireland Office minister
 John H. Wheeler (1806–1882), American diplomat, politician and historian
 John Ozias Wheeler (1823–?), American merchant and politician in California
 John Wheeler (New York politician) (1823–1906), U.S. representative from New York
 John P. Wheeler III (1944–2010), presidential aide to Ronald Reagan, George H. W. Bush and George W. Bush
 John Wheeler (Kansas politician) (born 1947), member of the Kansas House of Representatives

Science
 John Francis George Wheeler (1900–1979), British whale researcher, member of the Discovery Investigations
 John Archibald Wheeler (1911–2008), American theoretical physicist
 John Oliver Wheeler (1924–2015), Canadian geologist

Sports
 John Wheeler (Kent cricketer), English cricketer in the 1770s
 John Wheeler (cricketer, born 1844) (1844–1908), English cricketer
 Johnny Wheeler (1928–2019), English footballer

Other
 John Wheeler (college administrator) (1815–1881), first president of Baldwin Institute, a.k.a. Baldwin Wallace University
 John Wheeler (colonel) (1825–1863), Union officer in the American Civil War, killed at Gettysburg
 John W. Wheeler (1847–1907), newspaper editor
 John Wheeler (actor) (born 1930), American actor
 John Wheeler (musician) (born 1970), American musician, songwriter and music producer

See also
 Sir John Wheeler-Bennett (1902–1975), English historian
 John Wheeler House (disambiguation)
 Jack Wheeler (disambiguation)
 Wheeler (surname)